Cyril VII may refer to:

 Cyril VII Siaj (ruled 1794–1796)
 Patriarch Cyril VII of Constantinople (ruled 1855–1860)